Steven Thomas Kirby (born March 26, 1952) was the 35th Lieutenant Governor of South Dakota.  He is a member of local, state, and national boards of directors.

Early life and education
Kirby graduated with a bachelor of science degree in political science from Arizona State University and a Juris Doctor from the University of South Dakota School of Law. He married Suzette Hustead and became the father of a son and two daughters.

Career and politics
Kirby worked for Western Surety Company from 1977-92 as corporate secretary and senior claim counsel. He was a founding partner in South Dakota's largest venture capital firm, Bluestem Capital Company, which was established in 1992. After serving as Lieutenant Governor of South Dakota from 1993 to 1995, Kirby ran for the Republican nomination for Governor of South Dakota in 2002.

2002 South Dakota Gubernatorial Election

He entered the race after John Thune declared he would not run, but lost the election to Mike Rounds. It was one of South Dakota's greatest political upsets. Until late in 2001, then-Congressman Thune was the front-runner for the nomination. When Thune passed on the race in order to challenge Senator Tim Johnson, state Attorney General Mark Barnett and Kirby quickly became candidates. Rounds declared his candidacy late, in December 2001 and was out-raised and outspent ten-to-one by each of his opponents.

However, the contest between Kirby and Barnett soon became very negative and "dirty". Barnett attacked Kirby for not investing in companies based in South Dakota and for his involvement with Collagenesis, a company which removed skin from donated human cadavers and processed them for use. It became the subject of a massive scandal when it was revealed that the company was using the skins for much more lucrative cosmetic surgery like lip and penis enhancements while burn victims "lie waiting in hospitals as nurses scour the country for skin to cover their wounds, even though skin is in plentiful supply for plastic surgeons". Kirby invested in the company after the scandal broke and Barnett attacked him for it in television advertisements.

However, the advertisements backfired because "the claims were so outlandish, that people thought for sure that they were exaggerated or completely fabricated."

As the two front-runners concentrated on attacking each other, Rounds insisted on running a positive campaign and was not attacked by his opponents. Rounds' positive image and extensive knowledge of state government won him many supporters who were alienated by the front-runners. On the day of the primary election, Rounds won a stunning victory, with 44.3% of the vote to Barnett's 29.5% and Kirby's 26.1%.

Other political aspirations
Kirby considered running for the U.S. Senate in 2008 but declined to do so. He has said that he considered running for the Senate in 2014 following incumbent Senator Tim Johnson's retirement.

References

External links
Steve Kirby's profile at the eGisticis Inc. website
Bluestem Capital's website- includes a profile of Steve Kirby

1952 births
Arizona State University alumni
Lieutenant Governors of South Dakota
Living people
Politicians from Sioux Falls, South Dakota
South Dakota Republicans
University of South Dakota alumni